The table below details the Grand Prix results for Scuderia Ferrari's factory team-entered and privately entered Formula One cars since 1950 in a separate list. The distinction between factory team entries and privateers is important in the early years of the Formula One championships.

Formula One World Championship results
(key)

Scuderia Ferrari
Note. This table also includes entries by NART, since those were effectively proxy entries by Scuderia Ferrari itself.

1950s

1960s

1970s

1980s

1990s

2000s

2010s

2020s
(key)

Notes
* – Season still in progress.
† – The driver did not finish the Grand Prix, but was classified, as he completed over 90% of the race distance.
‡ – Half points awarded as less than 75% of the race distance was completed.
 – The Constructors World Championship did not exist before .
 – Shared drive.

Privately entered Ferrari cars
(key)

''* Indicates shared drive

Teams with Ferrari as an engine supplier

Non-championship Formula One results

References

Formula One constructor results
Ferrari in motorsport